Molybdenum(III) chloride is the inorganic compound with the formula MoCl3. It forms purple crystals.

Synthesis and structure
Molybdenum(III) chloride is synthesized by the reduction of molybdenum(V) chloride with hydrogen. A higher yield is produced by the reduction of pure molybdenum(V) chloride with anhydrous tin(II) chloride as the reducing agent.

Molybdenum trichloride exists as two polymorphs: alpha (α) and beta (β). The alpha structure is similar to that of aluminum chloride (AlCl3). In this structure, molybdenum has octahedral coordination geometry and exhibits cubic close-packing in its crystalline structure. The beta structure, however, exhibits hexagonal close packing.

Ether complexes
Molybdenum trichloride gives a ether complexes MoCl3(thf)3 and MoCl3(Et2O)3. They are beige, paramagnetic solids.  Both feature octahedral Mo centers.  The diethyl ether complex is synthesized by reducing a Et2O solution of MoCl5 with tin powder.  Older procedures involve stepwise reduction involving isolation of the Mo(IV)-thf complex.

Hexa(tert-butoxy)dimolybdenum(III) is prepared by the salt metathesis reaction from MoCl3(thf)3:
2 MoCl3(thf)3  +  6 LiOBu-t  →  Mo2(OBu-t)6  +  6 LiCl  +  6 thf

References 

Chlorides
Molybdenum halides
Molybdenum(III) compounds